Kenneth Olumuyiwa Tharp CBE  (born 1960) is a British dance artist and former Chief Executive of The Place. He was director of the Africa Centre, London from 2018 to 2020.

Biography
Tharp was born in Croydon, south London, to English mother Pamela Tharp and Nigerian father Gabriel Oluwole Esuruoso (1934-2013). His father, who had been a journalist for the Daily Times in Nigeria, came to England in the late 1950s to study veterinary medicine at the University of Glasgow, supported by a government scholarship; he became the first African holder of a Doctorate in Immunology, from the University of Birmingham. In 1964, Gabriel Esuruoso returned to Nigeria with his wife, Victoria Wuraola Emmanuel, and their three children, to work as a government veterinary officer; he subsequently became a professor in the Department of Veterinary Public Health and Preventive Medicine, and Dean of Veterinary Medicine, at the University of Ibadan.

Tharp attended The Perse School, Cambridge College of Arts and Technology, and trained at London Contemporary Dance School receiving a BA Hons (1st class) in Contemporary Dance in 1987. His 25-year performing career included working with London Contemporary Dance Theatre (1981–94) and Arc Dance Company (1994–2005). He has worked as a choreographer, teacher and director and as Lead Artist & Artistic Advisor for The Royal Ballet School’s Dance Partnership & Access Programme and Assistant to the Head of Contemporary Dance at Millennium Dance 2000. With composer Simon Redfern he co-founded Artyfartyarts, a multi-disciplinary arts group, and he is on the board of trustees at the Royal Opera House.

In 2005 Tharp undertook a NESTA-funded Fellowship on the Clore Leadership Programme.

He was Chief Executive of The Place from September 2007 to November 2016.

In May 2018 he was appointed director of the Africa Centre, London.

Awards and recognition
Tharp was appointed Officer of the Order of the British Empire (OBE) in 2003 and Commander of the Order of the British Empire (CBE) in the 2017 Birthday Honours, both for services to dance.

In 2015 he was named one of London's 1000 most influential people by the Evening Standard.

References

External links 

 "In Conversation - Kenneth Tharp and Robert Cohan". YouTube, 13 May 2013.

Living people
English people of Nigerian descent
English male dancers
English choreographers
Commanders of the Order of the British Empire
1960 births
People from Croydon